Kristapor Kara-Murza (sometimes also anglicized Christopher, birth name Khachatur; 18531902) was an Armenian composer.

References

1853 births
1902 deaths
Ethnic Armenian composers
People from Bilohirsk Raion